Salonia was a Roman slave, and later freedwoman who lived during the mid-2nd century BC, and who was the second wife of Cato the Elder. She was the young daughter of the slave Salonius who was an under-secretary to Cato the Elder. Following the death of his first wife, Cato began taking solace with a slave girl who secretly visited his bed.

However, his son Marcus Porcius Cato Licinianus and his son's wife disapproved of the relationship, so Cato decided to marry Salonia in order to solve the problem. However, when Licinianus found out about it he complained that now his problem was with his father's marriage to Salonia. Cato replied that he loved his son, and for that reason, wished to have more sons like him.

In 154 BC, Salonia gave birth to Marcus Porcius Cato Salonianus who was only five when his father died. Through her son, Salonia was grandmother of Lucius Porcius Cato and Marcus Porcius Cato, the great-grandmother of Cato the Younger.

Notes

2nd-century BC Roman women
Republican era slaves and freedmen